Andrew Chandler is the name of:
Andrew Chandler (actor), American voice actor
Andrew Chandler (golfer) (born 1953), English golfer

See also
Chandler (surname)